The Esperante is a sports car made by Panoz, an American car manufacturer.

First generation

There have been several Esperante models: the base model GT, the GTLM, the GTS, the JRD (an aftermarket upgrade brand similar to Roush Mustangs), the Brabham, and the 2015 430-hp Spyder and 560-hp Spyder GT. Each model has different specifications. The GTS on the other hand is built as a driver's class spec car, to SCCA standards, with harness, roll cage, side bars, etc. Additionally, it is around  lighter than the base Esperante, has a steel 5.8 liter V8 racing engine that produces , and is made of easily replaceable panels to facilitate small impact race repair.

Panoz's engines are sourced from General Motors LS-based small-block engine and Ford Motor Company's Modular V8 family. Production continues today. The company currently builds the Spyder and Spyder GT, an Esperante convertible with a removable hardtop, and a new version of the car was introduced in late 2015.

The specifications below apply to the 1st Generation. The current Esperante Specifications can be found at the Panoz website

Specification

Body and chassis
Layout: Front/mid-engine, rear wheel drive, luxury sport convertible
Body: Hand assembled lightweight SPF aluminum.
Chassis: Hand built Modular extruded aluminium, bolted and bonded to steel subframes

Engine and drivetrain
Engine: Ford Modular, Hand assembled DOHC, 32-valve, 90-degree, aluminum V8
Displacement: 4,601 cc
Power: 305 hp (309 PS; 227 kW)  @ 5800 rpm
Torque:  @ 4200 rpm
Compression Ratio: 9.8:1
bore by stroke: 3.55 by 3.54 in (90.2 by 90.0 mm)
Fuel: Gasoline 93 octane
Fuel injection:  Sequential electronic
Ignition: Distributorless, coil-on-plug
Transmission: Tremec T45 5-speed manual; 4-speed automatic (optional)
Gear Ratios: 1st: 3.37:1 2nd: 1.99:1 3rd: 1.33:1 4th: 1.00:1 5th: 0.67:1
Rev: 3.22:1 Final: 3.27:1
Differential: Limited-slip type, 8.8 inch (224 mm) ring gear, aluminum case
Weight:

Performance
0-62 mph (0–100 km/h): 4.2 sec (Esperante GTLM)
0-62 mph (0–100 km/h): 4.9 sec (Esperante GT)
0-62 mph (0–100 km/h): 5.1 sec (Esperante)
Quarter Mile: 13.4 sec. @ 107.3 mph (Esperante GT)
Quarter Mile: 13.7 sec. @ 103.5 mph (Esperante)
Lateral Acceleration: 0.96 g (Esperante GT)
Lateral Acceleration: 0.92 g (Esperante)
Top Speed: 155 mph (250 km/h) with manual transmission
Top Speed: 150 mph (242 km/h) with automatic transmission

Suspension
Front: Fully independent short-long arm (SLA) double wishbone configuration with gas charged Eibach coil-over shock absorbers and anti-roll bar
Rear: Fully independent, double wishbone with horizontally opposed, pushrod-and-rocker activated Penske gas charged coil-over shock absorbers and anti-roll bar.
Wheels:  Aluminum BBS, 17 by 9 inches (430 by 230 mm)
Installed Tires: Yokohama, Dunlop P255/45ZR17

Brakes
Manufacturer: Performance Friction Brakes
Type: Four-wheel power assisted ventilated discs
ABS: Electronic three channel, four sensor
Front: Dual-piston caliper with high-pressure steel braided brake lines and 13 inch (330 mm) vented steel rotor
Rear: Single-piston caliper with 11.7 inch (297 mm) vented steel rotor

Steering
Type Power assisted rack and pinion
Turns lock-to-lock: 2.5
Ratio: 15:1

Dimensions and capacities
Seating Capacity: 2
Wheelbase: 106.0 in (2.713 m)
Track:  front 60.9 in (1.55 m), rear 63.2 in (1.58 m)
Overall Length: 176.3 in (4.478 m)
Overall Width: 73.2 in (1.859 m)
Overall Height: 53.4 in (1.356 m)
Ride Height: 5.0 in (127 mm)
Curb Weight: 3200 lb (1,450 kg)
Fuel Capacity: 15.7 U.S. gal (59.4 L)

Other Technical specifications
AM/FM/ audio system With Subwoofers and dual Speakers 
Air Conditioning
Power windows
Cruise Control
Traction Control
Stability control
Power Folding Convertible top for the convertible model

Second generation

Racing (Panoz Esperante GTLM)

A racing version of the Esperante known as the Esperante GT-LM was developed by Panoz for the GT2 category of the 24 Hours of Le Mans. 2006 was a year of noticeable achievement for Panoz.

The #50 Multimatic Motorsports Team Panoz Esperante GT-LM took a first place podium finish at the 55th Annual Mobil 1 Twelve Hours of Sebring beating GT2 regulars BMW, Porsche, Ferrari, and Spyker.

That June the #81 Panoz Esperante GT-LM campaigned by England-based Team LNT  managed to outlast and overtake the remaining LMGT2 contenders in the final hour of the 2006 24 Hours of Le Mans.

In Europe, Team LNT will be campaigning two Esperantes also. They will be competing in the British GT Championship and Le Mans Endurance Series. Team LNT will be returning to the 24 Hours of Le Mans in 2007 with both the #81 and #82 cars.

During the 2007 American Le Mans season the Panoz Esperante GTLM will be managed, stateside, by Tom Milner and Team PTG. They will be campaigning two GT-LMs (#20 and #21). Team PTG scored 1 GT2 class podium in the hands of Bill Auberlen and Joey Hand in 2007 Sports Car Challenge of St. Petersburg. In the same year, Panoz Esperante GTLM also fielded Robertson Racing Team as 2007 ALMS season part-time entries in the hands of Andrea Robertson, David Robertson and Arie Luyendyk Jr.

References

External links

Panoz LLC
Team LNT
Team PTG Panoz

Esperante
Sports cars
Cars introduced in 2000